Orius laticollis is a species of true bug in the family Anthocoridae. The species was originally described by Odo Reuter in 1884

References

Anthocoridae